Clerques is a commune in the Pas-de-Calais department in the Hauts-de-France region of France.

Geography
A small farming village situated 10 miles (16 km) northwest of Saint-Omer, on the D217 road, nestled in the valley of the river Hem at the foot of the Boulonnais, which is a wooded ridge at this point. Two hamlets, Audenfort to the west and Le Hamel to the East, make up the remainder of the commune.

Population

History
The recent history of the village was marked by the flooding of the river, on August 13, 2006. The stone bridge in the village centre, built in 1862, was destroyed after exceptional rainfall upstream at Licques. The river, usually quiet, had accumulated such a speed it turned into an uncontrollable torrent.

Places of interest
 The church of St. Barthélemy, dating from the thirteenth century.
 The chapel of St. Théresa
 Audenfort mill, which ceased to operate in the 1970s, and is now converted into a hotel-restaurant
 The former flour mill at Hamel, now a hydro-electric generator.
 The new symbol of the village: The statue of the Sower, which symbolizes the friendship between the town of Clerques and the Belgian village of Klerken.

See also
Communes of the Pas-de-Calais department

References

External links

 Statistical data, INSEE

Communes of Pas-de-Calais